Charles Ludlow Livingston (1800 – April 1873) was an American politician from New York.

Early life
Livingston was the son of Cornelia Van Horne Livingston (b. 1759) and Philip Peter Livingston (1740–1810), a New York State Senator from 1789 to 1793 and from 1795 to 1798.  His surviving brother was Peter Van Brugh Livingston (1792–1868), the father of 9 children.

He was a grandson of Peter Van Brugh Livingston (1710–1792), a New York State Treasurer, and a great-great-grandson of Robert Livingston (1654–1728), the 2nd Lord of Livingston Manor.

Career
Livingston was a member of the New York State Assembly (New York Co.) in 1829, 1830, 1831, 1832 and 1833; and was Speaker in 1832 and 1833.  He was a Jacksonian.

He was a member of the New York State Senate (1st D.) from 1834 to 1837, sitting in the 57th, 58th, 59th and 60th New York State Legislatures.

Personal life
He married Margaret Allen (1804–1873), and their only child was:

 Catherine Ludlow Livingston (1825–1883), who married to Walter Langdon (1822–1894), the son of Walter Langdon (1788–1847) and Dorothea Astor (1795–1874), in 1847. After her death, she was buried at St. James's Church in Hyde Park, New York after her death.

Livingston died in April 1873.

References

External links
 Charles L. Livingston at Political Graveyard

1800 births
1873 deaths
Speakers of the New York State Assembly
New York (state) state senators
Charles Ludlow
19th-century American politicians